Robert Junior Mitchell (April 27, 1918 – October 13, 1992) was an American television writer. He wrote for television programs including Highway Patrol, Buck Rogers in the 25th Century, Combat!, Land of the Giants, Charlie's Angels, Hawaii Five-O, Cannon, Perry Mason, The High Chaparral, CHiPs, Shotgun Slade, Schlitz Playhouse, Maverick and The Outsider. 

Mitchell died in October 1992 of a car crash in Northridge, California, at the age of 74.

References

External links 

1918 births
1992 deaths
American screenwriters
American television writers
American male screenwriters
People from Casper, Wyoming
American male television writers
20th-century American screenwriters